Separative work – the amount of separation done by an enrichment process – is a function of the concentrations of the feedstock, the enriched output, and the depleted tailings; and is expressed in units which are so calculated as to be proportional to the total input (energy / machine operation time) and to the mass processed. Separative work is not energy.

The same amount of separative work will require different amounts of energy depending on the efficiency of the separation technology. Separative work is measured in Separative work units SWU, kg SW, or kg UTA (from the German Urantrennarbeit – literally uranium separation work)
 1 SWU = 1 kg SW = 1 kg UTA
 1 kSWU = 1 tSW = 1 t UTA
 1 MSWU = 1 ktSW = 1 kt UTA

Definition 
The work  necessary to separate a mass  of feed of assay  into a mass  of product assay , and tails of mass  and assay  is given by the expression:

where  is the value function, defined as:

and satisfies

The feed to product ratio is given by the expression

whereas the tails to product ratio is given by the expression

Example 

The number of separative work units provided by an enrichment facility is directly related to the amount of energy that the facility consumes. Modern gaseous diffusion plants typically require 2,400 to 2,500 kilowatt-hours (kW·h), or 8.6–9 gigajoules, (GJ) of electricity per SWU while gas centrifuge plants require just 50 to 60 kW·h (180–220 MJ) of electricity per SWU.

Example:

A large nuclear power station with a net electrical capacity of 1300 MW requires about 25 tonnes per year (25 t/a) of LEU with a 235U concentration of 3.75%. This quantity is produced from about 210 t of NU using about 120 kSWU. An enrichment plant with a capacity of 1000 kSWU/a is, therefore, able to enrich the uranium needed to fuel about eight large nuclear power stations.

References 

Nuclear fuels